Mărgău is a commune in Cluj County, Transylvania, Romania. It is composed of six villages: Bociu (Bocs), Buteni (Kalotabökény), Ciuleni (Incsel), Mărgău, Răchițele (Havasrekettye) and Scrind-Frăsinet (Kőrizstető).

Răchițele village is the birthplace of former Romanian Prime Minister Emil Boc, currently Mayor of Cluj-Napoca, while Mărgău village is the birthplace of Iosif Capotă, a noted anti-communist resistance fighter from the early Communist era.

Mărgău is notable for the Gumuțeasca, an argot spoken in the commune created by the natives to speak between each other without outsiders understanding them when travelling around the country to sell their glass products, a traditional profession of the commune.

Geography

Demographics 
According to the census from 2002 there was a total population of 1,869 people living in this commune. Of this population, 99.62% are ethnic Romanians, 0.26% are ethnic Hungarians and 0.10% ethnic Romani.

Natives
Emil Boc
Iosif Capotă

References
Atlasul localităților județului Cluj (Cluj County Localities Atlas), Suncart Publishing House, Cluj-Napoca, 

Communes in Cluj County
Localities in Transylvania